Thomas Stuart Ian Hamilton (born 23 November 1992) is an English former first-class cricketer.

Hamilton was born at Derby in November 1992. He was educated there at Chellaston Academy, before going up to Cardiff University. While studying at Cardiff, he made a single appearance in first-class cricket for Cardiff MCCU in 2014 and Gloucestershire at Bristol. Batting once in the match, he was dismissed by Jack Taylor for 38 in Cardiff MCCU's only innings, in addition to bowling nine wicketless overs across both Gloucestershire innings'.

References

External links

1992 births
Living people
Cricketers from Derby
Alumni of Cardiff University
English cricketers
Cardiff MCCU cricketers